USS Wyandotte is a name used for two ships of the United States Navy:

 , a steamer built at Philadelphia, Pennsylvania, in 1853 which served in the American Civil War.
 , a  monitor originally named Tippecanoe which was launched in 1864.

United States Navy ship names